The 2020 Illinois Democratic presidential primary took place on March 17, 2020, the third primary Tuesday of the month, as one of three states voting on the same day in the Democratic Party primaries for the 2020 presidential election, while the contest in Ohio had been postponed for roughly a month. The Illinois primary was an open primary, with the state awarding 182 delegates to the 2020 Democratic National Convention, of which 155 were pledged delegates allocated on the basis of the results of the primary.

Immediately after the polls closed at 7:00 pm Central Time, the Associated Press declared former vice president Joe Biden the winner of the Illinois primary. Biden was victorious in all but one county, Champaign County, winning 59% of the vote and 95 delegates, while senator Bernie Sanders received the rest of 36% and 60 delegates. Together with his victories on the same day in Florida and Arizona, Biden greatly expanded the gap in delegates between him and Sanders. Voter turnout was significantly down from 2016, due to the closure of polling places as a result of the COVID-19 pandemic.

Procedure
Illinois was one of three states which held primaries on March 17, 2020, alongside Arizona and Florida, while only one day before Ohio had been the first state to postpone its primary due to the COVID-19 pandemic and cancel in-person voting, accepting ballots until April 28 instead.

Voting took place throughout the state from 6:00 a.m. until 7:00 p.m. In the open primary, candidates had to meet a threshold of 15 percent at the congressional district or statewide level in order to be considered viable. The 155 pledged delegates to the 2020 Democratic National Convention were allocated proportionally on the basis of the results of the primary. Of these, between three and eight were allocated to each of the state's 18 congressional districts and another 20 were allocated to party leaders and elected officials (PLEO delegates), in addition to 34 at-large delegates. As a March primary on Stage I of the primary timetable Illinois received no bonus delegates, in order to disperse the primaries between more different date clusters and keep too many states from hoarding on a March date.

National convention district level delegates were listed on the ballot and chosen during the primary. The national convention delegation meeting was subsequently held on April 27, 2020 to vote on the 34 at-large and 20 pledged PLEO delegates for the Democratic National Convention through a quorum of district delegates. The delegation also included 27 unpledged PLEO delegates: 10 members of the Democratic National Committee, 15 members of Congress (both senators and 13 representatives), the governor J. B. Pritzker, and former president Barack Obama.

Candidates
The following candidates qualified for the ballot in Illinois:

Running

Joe Biden
Tulsi Gabbard
Bernie Sanders

Withdrawn

Michael Bennet
Michael Bloomberg
Cory Booker
Pete Buttigieg
John Delaney
Deval Patrick
Tom Steyer
Elizabeth Warren
Andrew Yang

Polling

Results

See also
2020 Illinois Republican presidential primary
2020 United States presidential election in Illinois
2020 Illinois elections
Illinois Fair Tax Nov. 2020 ballot referendum

Notes

References

External links
The Green Papers delegate allocation summary
Illinois Democratic Party delegate selection plan

Illinois Democratic
Democratic primary
2020
Illinois Democratic primary